Chaco tigre is a species of mygalomorph spiders of Chile, named after its type locality: Quebrada El Tigre, Petorca, Region V (Valparaíso Region). This species differs from C. socos by its spermathecae having a shorter duct and a more globose fundus, and by constructing a thin door for its burrow; the general colouration is brownish, while C. socos is more grayish coloured.

Description
The labium length is 82% of its width. The sternum width is 82% of its length. The labium possesses six small cuspules. Its posterior sternal sigilla is well marked. Its cephalothorax and legs are yellowish brown, while the legs carry darker spots; the abdomen is lighter, with some brown coloring.

The cephalic region's width is 77% of the cephalothorax's width. The labium length is 52% of its width. The sternum width is 75% of its length. The labium possesses six large cuspules. A serrula is apparently absent. The colour is the same as in the male.

Distribution and behaviour
This species has been collected in places of inclined, sandy or stony soil. It lives in burrows closed with a single door (unlike Chaco obscura and C. tucumana). The door is thin, on which "growth rings" are sometimes visible. The tube of the burrow is often prolonged with silk and earth in the upper portion. The smooth, well-compacted walls are covered with little silk. It is found in Región Metropolitana and Region V.

See also
Spider anatomy
List of Nemesiidae species

References

External links
ADW entry

Nemesiidae
Spiders of South America
Spiders described in 1995
Endemic fauna of Chile